Rhodeus rheinardti  is a tropical freshwater fish belonging to the Acheilognathinae subfamily of the  family Cyprinidae.  It originates in the Perfume River, near Hué, Vietnam. It was originally described as Danio rheinardti by G. Tirant in 1883.

Named possibly in honor of Pierre-Paul Rheinart (1840-1902), a French official in Hué, Viêt Nam (type locality for this bitterling), who sent zoological specimens to Paris.

When spawning, the females deposit their eggs inside bivalves, where they hatch and the young remain until they can swim.

References 

rheinardti
Fish described in 1883
Taxa named by Gilbert Tirant